The Athenaeum of Philadelphia, located at 219 S. 6th Street between St. James Place and Locust Street in the Society Hill neighborhood of Philadelphia, Pennsylvania, is a special collections library and museum founded in 1814 to collect materials "connected with the history and antiquities of America, and the useful arts, and generally to disseminate useful knowledge" for public benefit.  The Athenaeum's collections include architecture and interior design history, particularly for the period 1800 to 1945.  The institution focuses on the history of American architecture and building technology, and houses architectural archives of 180,000 drawings, over 350,000 photographs, and manuscript holdings of about 1,000 American architects.

Since 1950 the Athenaeum has sponsored the annual Athenaeum Literary Award for works of fiction and non-fiction.

Historic building 

The building was designed in 1845 by architect John Notman in the Italianate style, and was one of the first buildings in the city to be built of brownstone, although it was originally planned to be faced in marble – brownstone was used because it was cheaper.  Notman's design was influenced by the work of the English architect Charles Barry.

The building was declared a National Historic Landmark in 1976, as one of the nation's first examples of a building with a palazzo-style facade, and for its historic importance as an educational institution. Today, it is operated as a museum furnished with American fine and decorative arts from the first half of the nineteenth century.

On the right of the athenaeum is the house of Richardson Dilworth, the Mayor of Philadelphia from 1956 to 1962.

Athenaeum Literary Award 
The Athenaeum Literary Award is a literary award presented by Athenaeum of Philadelphia since 1950. It is awarded to authors who are "bona fide residents of Philadelphia or Pennsylvania living within a radius of 30 miles of City Hall". Eligible works are of general fiction or non-fiction; technical, scientific, and juvenile books are not included. The award was established in 1950 by Charles Wharton Stork (1881–1971), who was a board member of the Athenaeum from 1919 until 1968.

Recipients
Source: Athenaeum Literary Award previous winners (1949–present)

1949
John L. Lamonte, The World of the Middle Ages
1950
Henry N. Paul, The Royal Play of Macbeth
1951
Arthur Hobson Quinn, 'The Literature of the American People1952
Nicholas B. Wainwright, A Philadelphia Story1953
Lawrence Henry Gipson, The Great War for the Empire 1760-1763, vol. 8, The Culmination, 1760-17631954
Davis Grubb, The Night of the Hunter1955
Conyers Read, Mr. Secretary and Queen Elizabeth1956
Livingston Biddle, Jr., The Village BeyondSamuel Noah Kramer, From the Tablets of Summer1957
Catherine Drinker Bowen, The Lion and the ThroneBettina Linn, A Letter to Elizabeth1958
Loren Eisley,[sic] Darwin's CenturyLyon Sprague DeCamp,[sic] An Elephant for Aristotle1959
John Edwin Canaday, Mainstreams of Modern Art: David to Picasso1960
Edwin Wolf II (with John F. Fleming), Rosenbach: a biographyDavid Taylor, Storm the Last Rampart1961
Roy F. Nichols, The Stakes of Power, 1845-1877Lauren R. Stevens, The Double Axe1962
Curtis Bok, MariaCarleton S. Coon, The Origin of RacesRichard S. Dunn, Puritans and Yankees1963
Daniel Hoffman, The City of SatisfactionsSamuel Noah Kramer, The Sumerians1964
Kristin Hunter, God Bless the ChildElizabeth Gray Vining, Take Heed of Loving MeDorothy Shipley White, Seeds of Discord1965
Laurence Davis Lafore, The Long Fuse1966
Edward S. Gifford, Jr., Father Against the Devil1967
Daniel P.Mannix, The Fox and the HoundEdmund N. Bacon, Design of Cities1968
Ernest Penney Earnest, Expatriates and PatriotsRobert C. Smith, The Art of Portugal1969
Henry Clarence Pitz, The Brandywine TraditionChaim Potok, The Promise1970
No award
1971
Loren Eiseley, The Night Country1972
Jerre Mangione, The Dream and the Deal1973
John Maas, The Glorious Enterprise1974
John R. Coleman, Blue Collar Journal1975
Martin P. Snyder, City of Independence1976
No award
1977
Seymour Adelman, The Moving PageantJohn Francis Marion, Famous and Curious CemeteriesBarbara Rex, I Want to Be in Love Again1978
Anthony F.C. Wallace, RockdalePeggy Anderson, NurseElizabeth Gray Vining, Being SeventyJan V. Westcott, A Woman of Quality1979
E. Digby Baltzell, Puritan Boston and Quaker PhiladelphiaRichard J. Boyle, John TwachtmanDorothy Shipley White, Black Africa and De Gaulle1980
Arthur R.G. Solmssen, A Princess in BerlinLois G. Forer, Criminals and VictimsJames C. Humes, Churchill: Speaker of the Century1981
David Bradley, The Chaneysville IncidentDaniel Hoffman, Brotherly LoveJohn A. Lukacs, Philadelphia, Patricians & Philistines, 1900-1950Edgar P. Richardson, Charles Willson Peale and His WorldRussell F. Weigley, Eisenhower's Lieutenants1982
Susan Gray Detweiler, George Washington's ChinawareJean Seder, Voices of KensingtonDesmond Ryan, DeadlinesSeymour Shubin, The CaptainDavid R. Slavitt, Ringer1983
Gerald Carson, The Dentist and the EmpressHelen H. Gemmill, E.L., the Bread Box Papers1984
Roland M. Frye, The Renaissance HamletJean Gordon Lee, Philadelphians and the China Trade, 1784-1844Philip Chadwick Foster Smith, The Empress of China1985
Ralph Keyes, Chancing ItThomas Maeder, Crime and MadnessCarroll Smith-Rosenberg, Disorderly Conduct1986
David Eisenhower, Eisenhower: At War, 1943-1945Julie Nixon Eisenhower, Pat NixonMichael Malone, Handling SinBarry Schwartz, The Battle for Human Nature1987
No award
1988
Marilyn Gaull, English RomanticismBarbara Holland, The Name of the CatJohn Allen Paulos, Innumeracy1989
Coral Lansbury, The GrottoEmily W. Sunstein, Mary ShelleyJames Snyder, Medieval Art1990
Matthews Masayuki Hamabata, Crested KimonoCamille Paglia, Sexual PersonaePaul Halpern, Time JourneysOra Mendels, A Taste for Treason1991
Art Carey, The United States of IncompetenceElizabeth Johns, American Genre PaintingRoger Lane, William Dorsey's Philadelphia and Ours1992
Arthur Power Dudden, The America Pacific1993
Seymour I. Toll, A Judge UncommonSusan Q. Stranahan, Susquehanna, River of Dreams1994
Paul Fussell, The Anti-EgotistSteve Lopez, Third and IndianaBarry Schwartz, The Costs of Living1995
Thomas Childers, Wings of MorningWitold Rybczynski, City LifeSusan Stewart, The Forest1996
Peter Conn, Pearl S. Buck: A Cultural BiographyDiane McKinney-Whetstone, Tumbling1997
A.C. Elias, Jr., Memoirs of Laetitia PilkingtonKathleen A. Foster and Kenneth Finkel, Captain Watson's Travels in AmericaDavid P. Silverman, Ancient EgyptMary Walton, Car1998
James J. O'Donnell, Avatars of the WordLeonard Warren, Joseph Leidy: The Last Man Who Knew Everything1999
J. Welles Henderson & Rodney P. Carlisle,  Jack Tar: A Sailor's Life, 1750–1910Witold Rybczynski, A Clearing In The DistanceJonathan Weiner, Time, Love, Memory2000
Susan Sidlauskas, Body, Place, and Self in Nineteenth-Century PaintingPatricia Tyson Stroud, The Emperor of Nature; Charles-Lucien Bonaparte and His WorldGeorge E. Thomas, William L. Price; Arts and Crafts to Modern DesignBen Yagoda, About Town; The New Yorker and the World It Made2001
No award.
2002
Jane Golden, Robin Rice & Monica Yant Kinney, Philadelphia Murals and the Stories They TellCharlene Mires, Independence Hall in American Memory2003
Jack Repcheck, The Man Who Found Time2004
Roger W. Moss, Historic Sacred Places of Philadelphia2005
Kermit Roosevelt, In the Shadow of the Law2006
David Traxel, Crusader Nation: The United States in Peace and the Great War, 1898–19202007
Jon Clinch, Finn: A Novel2008
Walter A. McDougall, Throes of Democracy: The American Civil War Era, 1829–18772009
Richard Beeman, Plain, Honest Men: The Making of The American Constitution2010
Robin Black, If I Loved You, I Would Tell You This: StoriesStephen Fried, Appetite For America: How Visionary Businessman Fred Harvey Built a Railroad Hospitality Empire that Civilized the West2011
No award.
2012
Liz Moore, Heft: A NovelSteven Ujifusa, A Man and His Ship: America’s Greatest Naval Architect and His Quest to Build the S. S. United StatesRobert McCracken Peck and Patricia Tyson Stroud, A Glorious Enterprise: The Academy of Natural Sciences of Philadelphia and the Making of American Science2013
Adrian Raine, The Anatomy of Violence: The Biological Roots of CrimeGeorge H. Marcus and William Whitaker, The Houses of Louis Kahn2014
Jessica Choppin Roney, Governed By A Spirit of Opposition2015
David Grazian, American Zoo: A Sociological SafariBarbara Miller Lane, Houses for a New World: Builders and Buyers in American Suburbs2016
Gino Segre and Bettina Hoerlin, The Pope of PhysicsJudith E. Stein, Eye of the Sixties2017
Erica Armstrong Dunbar, "Never Caught: the Washingtons' Relentless Pursuit of Their Runaway Slave Ona Judge"
Carol Eaton Soltis, "The Art of the Peales in the Philadelphia Museum of Art"
2018
Madeline Miller, CircePatrick Spero, Frontier Rebels: the Fight for Independence in the American West, 1765-17762019
Edward Posnett, Strange Harvests 
Witold Rybczynski, Charleston Fancy2020
Michele Harper, The Beauty in BreakingLynn Miller and Therese Dolan, Salut! France Meets Philadelphia2021
Quiara Alegria Hudes, My Broken LanguageMiles Orvell, Empire of Ruins''

See also 

List of National Historic Landmarks in Philadelphia
National Register of Historic Places listings in Center City, Philadelphia

References 
Notes

External links 

Athenaeum Literary Award , official website.

Historic American Buildings Survey in Philadelphia
1814 establishments in Pennsylvania
National Historic Landmarks in Pennsylvania
Libraries on the National Register of Historic Places in Philadelphia
Cultural infrastructure completed in 1845
Art museums and galleries in Philadelphia
Decorative arts museums in the United States
Organizations based in Philadelphia
History of Philadelphia
Society Hill, Philadelphia